The following is a list of FCC-licensed radio stations in the U.S. state of New Mexico, which can be sorted by their call signs, frequencies, cities of license, licensees, and programming formats.

List of radio stations

Defunct
 KARA
 KCRX
 KKYC
 KLEA
 KLEA-FM
 KLLT
 KOOT
 KPAD-LP
 KQGC
 KRDD
 KSRL-LP
 KYGR
 KZPI
 KZRM

References

 
Radio stations
New Mexico